Woodeaton Wood is a  biological Site of Special Scientific Interest north of Oxford in Oxfordshire.

This coppice with standards on calcareous soil is a fragment of the ancient Shotover Forest. The ground layer has plants such as wood anemone, nettle-leaved bellflower, ransoms, goldilocks  buttercup, early dog-violet and enchanter's nightshade.

The site is private land with no public access.

References

 
Sites of Special Scientific Interest in Oxfordshire